Brighton Regency Synagogue is a Regency building in Devonshire Place, Brighton, that was built in 1824 as a synagogue and is now an apartment building. It is a Grade II listed building.

History
The synagogue was built in 1824–25. It was enlarged in 1836–38 to designs by David Mocatta, England's first Jewish architect.

The building's chaste, pilastered facade, symmetry, and central doorway are typical of the Regency style. A faded inscription reading  (1838) was faintly visible under the pediment in 2006. Inside, the original ceiling lantern, a typical Regency feature, is still in place.

The building was replaced by the Middle Street Synagogue in 1875, and sold. By 2007 it had been converted into apartments, with the facade sensitively restored and an historic plaque mentioning the architect on the façade.

See also
Grade II listed buildings in Brighton and Hove: A–B
List of places of worship in Brighton and Hove

References

Bibliography

External links

1838 establishments in England
Former religious buildings and structures in Brighton and Hove
Former synagogues in England
Grade II listed buildings in Brighton and Hove
Regency architecture in England
Regency and Biedermeier synagogues
Synagogues completed in 1838
Synagogues in Brighton and Hove
David Mocatta buildings